Mae Daet is a tambon (subdistrict) of Galyani Vadhana District, in Chiang Mai Province, Thailand. In 2012 it had a population of 3,601 people.

History
The subdistrict was created in 1995, when five administrative villages were split off from Ban Chan subdistrict.

Administration
The subdistrict is divided into eight administrative villages. The Mae Daet Subdistrict administrative organization is the local government responsible for the subdistrict area, established in 1999.

Administrative village 8 was established on 14 January 2014.

References

External links
Website of Mae Daet TAO
ThaiTambon on Mae Daet

Tambon of Chiang Mai province
Populated places in Chiang Mai province